Kvænangsfjellet is a line of mountains along the border of the municipalities of Kvænangen and Nordreisa in Troms og Finnmark county, Norway. The European route E6 highway traverses the mountains through a mountain pass between the Oksfjorden in the west to the Kvænangen fjord in the east. In the winter, route E6 is closed for 10 to 15 days due to snow storms. The structure was destroyed in scorched earth tactics when the Germans withdrew to the south in 1944.

The Gildetun Inn is located along the E6 road that crosses the Kvænangsfjellet.  It offers accommodation and meals during tourist season. It is located at a vantage place where tourists are able to photograph the mountain and fjord landscape. It also has a taxidermy display of local birds and other animals.

The Kvænangsfjellet area is used in the summer by Sami reindeer herders.

Gallery

References

External links
Gildetun Inn on Kvænangsfjellet

Geography of Troms og Finnmark
European route E6
Mountain passes of Norway